Indecent Exposure is a satirical novel by British writer Tom Sharpe, originally published in 1973. The sequel to Riotous Assembly, the author's debut novel, this story also lampoons the South African police under apartheid.

Plot summary

Set in the fictional South African town of Piemburg, where local police, headed by Kommandant van Heerden, Lieutenant Verkramp and Konstabel Els, are determined to maintain the government policy of apartheid. While the Kommandant is absent at the country home of a snobbish upper class English couple, Lieutenant Verkramp enlists the help of a female psychiatrist to provide the police garrison with aversion therapy, with the aim of stopping them from fraternising with black girls. However, this goes horribly awry and turns the town's entire police force into homosexuals. Called back from his holiday, Kommandant van Heerden attempts to restore some order.

References

South African comedy novels
Novels by Tom Sharpe
Sequel novels
Apartheid novels
Secker & Warburg books